GENtle is a free software under GPL license.

Features 

GENtle is an equivalent to the proprietary Vector NTI, a tool for molecular biologists to analyze and edit DNA sequence files. Invitrogens' removal of the free-of-cost academic licence for Vector NTI v11 has had a severe impact on many molecular biology labs that have come to rely on that tool, which led to vendor lock-in effects, which angered many molecular biologists. The GENtle code is developed and maintained by Magnus Manske. By design, GENtle is coded to be cross-platform utilizing wxGTK.

References

Bioinformatics software
Free science software
Science software for Linux
Software that uses wxWidgets